Dongmen is a metro station in Taipei, Taiwan served by the Taipei Metro. It is an interchange station with the Tamsui–Xinyi line and the Zhonghe–Xinlu line, which opened on 24 November 2013. The station opened on 30 September 2012 with the opening of the Zhongxiao Xinsheng to Guting segment of the Zhonghe–Xinlu line.

Station overview
The station is a four-level, underground station with island platforms for both the Tamsui–Xinyi and Zhonghe–Xinlu Lines. The platforms are stacked, allowing for cross-platform interchange between the two lines. The Xinyi Line station is  meters long and  meters wide. and eight exits, one accessibile elevator, and two vent shafts.

Construction
Construction on this part started in March 2004 and was completed on 26 April 2007. It was announced that on 15 July 2010, the intersection of Jinshan South Road and Xinyi Road would be restored to its pre-construction state.

Tunnels
Because the station is the interchange station of the Xinyi and Xinzhuang Lines, five tunnels intersect in a twisted form beneath the nearby Hangzhou South Road: two Xinyi Line tunnels, two Xinzhuang Line tunnels, and a common duct. They are stacked and intersected underneath existing buildings and run along Sec 2, Hangzhou South Rd. Construction on the five tunnels began on 15 September 2005 with the start of construction on the Red Line and was completed by 17 January 2009. The common duct, by far the shallowest of the five, is  underground.

Station layout

Around the Station

 Dongmen Market

References

Railway stations opened in 2012
Tamsui–Xinyi line stations
Zhonghe–Xinlu line stations